Bignall is a surname. Notable people with the surname include:

Bob Bignall (1922–2013), Australian soccer player
Herbert Bignall (1906–1989), British long-distance runner
Kris Bignall (born 1979), Australian Paralympic boccia player
Nicholas Bignall (born 1990), English footballer
Simone Bignall, Australian philosopher
Thomas Bignall (1842–1898), English cricketer